Gert Mittring (born May 26, 1966 in Stuttgart) is a German mental calculator. He was inspired by the late Wim Klein. He has competed in the MSO mental calculation event every year since 2004, failing to win the gold medal outright on only four occasions. He has held numerous world records for mental calculation, such as calculating the 89247th root of a 1000000 digit number. He has doctorates in statistics and mathematics education, and is a member of the Intelligence Research Committee of Intertel. Mittring is said to have been poor in math during his school years. He has written several books on mental calculation.

References 

 Bredenkamp, J., Klein, K.-M., von Hayn, S. & Vaterrodt, B. (1988). Gedächtnispsychologische Untersuchungen eines Rechenkünstlers. Sprache und Kognition, 7, S. 69–83. 
 Bredenkamp, J. (1990). Kognitionspsychologische Untersuchungen eines Rechenkünstlers. In: H. Feger (Hg.): Wissenschaft und Verantwortung. Hogrefe, Göttingen 
 Bredenkamp, J. &  Klein, K.-M. (1996). Strategien und Arbeitsgedächtnis eines Rechenkünstlers.

External links 
Gert Mittring's official site
TV Total 2014
Deutschlands Superhirn 2016
World record root extraction 2015
World record prime number extraction 2013
MSO interview 2015

Mental calculators
People from Stuttgart
1966 births
Living people
Mensans